Man of Steel is a 2013 superhero film based on the DC Comics character Superman. Directed by Zack Snyder from a screenplay by David S. Goyer, it is the first installment in the DC Extended Universe (DCEU) and a reboot of the Superman film series, depicting the character's origin story. It stars Henry Cavill in the title role along with Amy Adams, Michael Shannon, Kevin Costner, Diane Lane, Laurence Fishburne, and Russell Crowe. In the film, Clark Kent learns that he is a superpowered alien from the planet Krypton. He assumes the role of mankind's protector as Superman, making the choice to face General Zod and prevent him from destroying humanity. 

Development began in 2008 when Warner Bros. took pitches from comic book writers, screenwriters, and directors, opting to reboot the franchise. In 2009, a court ruling resulted in Jerry Siegel's family recapturing the rights to Superman's origins and Siegel's copyright. The decision stated that Warner Bros. did not owe the families additional royalties from previous films, but if they did not begin production on a Superman film by 2011, then the Shuster and Siegel estates would be able to sue for lost revenue on an unproduced film. Producer Christopher Nolan pitched Goyer's idea after a story discussion on The Dark Knight Rises, and Snyder was hired as the film's director in October 2010. Principal photography began in August 2011 in West Chicago, Illinois, before moving to Vancouver and Plano, Illinois.

Man of Steel premiered in the Alice Tully Hall on June 10, 2013, and was released in the United States on June 14, 2013. Critics felt the film's visually-appealing action sequences were not enough to overcome its descent into "generic blockbuster territory", and they were divided over Cavill's performance as Superman. It grossed over $668million worldwide, becoming the ninth-highest-grossing film of 2013. A follow-up titled Batman v Superman: Dawn of Justice was released on March 25, 2016, while a direct sequel under various stages of development since 2014 was canceled following the restructuring of DC Films as DC Studios in late 2022.

Plot

The planet Krypton is destabilized from the mining of the planetary core. Just before the planet explodes, Krypton's supreme council chief advisor Jor-El infuses the genetics codex into his infant son, Kal-El, the first naturally born Kryptonian child in centuries. Jor-El manages to send Kal-El in a spacecraft toward Earth before being killed by General Zod during an uprising. Kal-El lands in Kansas, where he is adopted by Jonathan and Martha Kent and named Clark. As he grows older, he develops superhuman powers that Jonathan urges him to keep hidden, even refusing Clark's help years later during a tornado incident where he loses his life. Burdened with guilt over Jonathan's death, Clark travels the globe hiding under various aliases seeking a purpose in life.

Daily Planet reporter Lois Lane receives an assignment to investigate the discovery of a Kryptonian scout ship in the Canadian Arctic. Clark enters the ship disguised as a worker and learns from its artificial intelligence (AI), modeled after his father Jor-El, that Clark was sent to Earth to guide its people. While following Clark, Lois inadvertently triggers the ship's security system, and he uses his powers to rescue Lois from its defenses. He wears a uniform provided by the ship's AI and begins testing his flying abilities. Unable to convince supervisor Perry White to publish an article on the incident, Lois tracks down Clark in Smallville, with the intent of exposing him. However, Lois drops the story upon hearing of Jonathan Kent's sacrifice, keeping Clark's identity safe, which fuels Perry's suspicions.

Zod and his crew escape the Phantom Zone, where they were imprisoned for treason for their actions against Krypton. They travel to Earth to turn it into a new Krypton, possessing several terraforming devices salvaged from Kryptonian outposts. Following Clark and Lois' capture, Zod's science officer, Jax-Ur, extracts Clark's genes to create Kryptonian colonists who will build a society based on Zod's ideals of genetic purity. Using the Jor-El AI to take over the ship, Clark and Lois flee and warn the U.S. military of Zod's plan, resulting in an explosive confrontation between Clark and Zod's troops.

Zod deploys his most powerful terraforming device, the World Engine, which severely damages Metropolis and puts humanity's existence at risk. Clark destroys the terraforming platform while the military launches a suicide attack, sending Zod's troops back to the Phantom Zone. With the ship destroyed and Krypton's only hope of revival gone, Zod vows to destroy Earth and its inhabitants out of revenge. The two Kryptonians engage in a lengthy battle across Metropolis, which concludes when Clark is forced to kill Zod as he attacks a family in a train station. Sometime later, Clark adopts the moniker "Superman" and persuades the government to let him act independently, under the condition he does not turn against humanity. To gain covert access to dangerous situations, he takes a job under his civilian identity, Clark Kent, as a reporter for the Daily Planet.

Cast

 Henry Cavill as Kal-El / Clark Kent:  A Kryptonian with superhuman powers and abilities, sent by his parents to Earth as an infant to escape the destruction of his homeworld, Krypton, and raised under the mental guidance of farmers in Smallville, Kansas, until he is inspired by the holographic message from his late father to become Earth's greatest protector. Cavill is the first non-American actor to play the character. He was previously cast in Superman: Flyby, which was ultimately shelved, and was considered for the role in the 2006 film Superman Returns, but lost to Brandon Routh. Cavill stated, "There's a very real story behind the Superman character." He explained that everyone's goal has been to explore the difficulties his character faces as a result of having multiple identities—including his birth name, Kal-El, and his alter ego, Clark Kent. Cavill also stated that "He's alone and there's no one like him," referring to Superman's vulnerabilities. "That must be incredibly scary and lonely, not to know who you are or what you are, and trying to find out what makes sense. Where's your baseline? What do you draw from? Where do you draw a limit with the power you have? In itself, that's an incredible weakness." In an interview with Total Film magazine, Cavill stated he had been consuming nearly 5,000 calories a day, training for over two hours daily and plowing protein to pack on the muscle mass. Tyler Hoechlin (who would later play the character in the Arrowverse and Superman & Lois), Matthew Goode, Armie Hammer, Jamie Dornan, Joe Manganiello and Colin O'Donoghue were also considered for the role. Manganiello was subsequently cast as Deathstroke in Justice League. Cooper Timberline was cast as the 9-year-old Clark Kent, and Dylan Sprayberry was cast as the 13-year-old Clark Kent.
 Amy Adams as Lois Lane:  A reporter for the Daily Planet newspaper and the love interest of Clark Kent. Adams was selected from a list of actresses that included Kristen Stewart, Zoe Saldaña, Olivia Wilde, and Mila Kunis. "There was a big, giant search for Lois," Snyder said. "For us, it was a big thing and obviously a really important role. We did a lot of auditioning, but we had this meeting with Amy Adams and after that I just felt she was perfect for it." Adams auditioned for the role three times: once for the unproduced Superman: Flyby, and the second time for Superman Returns before landing the current role. Adams was confirmed to play Lois Lane in March 2011. While announcing the role, Snyder said in a statement, "We are excited to announce the casting of Amy Adams, one of the most versatile and respected actresses in films today. Amy has the talent to capture all of the qualities we love about Lois: smart, tough, funny, warm, ambitious and, of course, beautiful." On portraying Lois Lane, Adams stated that the film would feature a Lois Lane who is an "independent, feisty woman ... but set in a more identifiable world." Adams said that "She has become more of a free-ranging journalist, someone who likes to be hands-on. The nature of the newspaper business has changed so much. There is so much more pressure."
 Michael Shannon as General Zod:  A Kryptonian general with the same superpowers as Superman, bent on transforming Earth into a new Krypton under his reign. Viggo Mortensen and Daniel Day-Lewis were also considered for the role. Snyder stated, "Zod is not only one of Superman's most formidable enemies, but one of the most significant because he has insights into Superman that others don't. Michael is a powerful actor who can project both the intelligence and the malice of the character, making him perfect for the role." When Goyer was asked about why Zod was chosen as the villain, he stated, "The way (Christopher) Nolan and I have always approached movies as well is you never say, 'Hey, which villain would be cool for this movie?' You start with the story first. What kind of story? What kind of theme do you want to tell? So we worked that out. Then, usually the villain becomes obvious in terms of who's going to be the appropriate antagonist for that. When you guys see the movie, the only villain we could've used was Zod and the Kryptonians. I mean, when you see what the whole story is, nothing else would have even made sense."
 Kevin Costner as Jonathan Kent:   Clark's adoptive father. Snyder explained his reason for his casting the on-screen couple is solely for the realism: "I think the thing you realize when you look at Diane and Kevin, in our decision to cast them so far, you sort of get a sense of how tonally we're looking at the movie, and what you realize is that those guys are serious actors, and we're taking this movie very seriously in terms of the tone of having those guys. You're talking about having a situation where whatever the action is or whatever the drama of the movie is, our first priority is to make sure it's rendered in the most realistic way we can get at."
 Diane Lane as Martha Kent:  Clark's adoptive mother. Lane was the first cast member to join the film after Cavill. "This was a very important piece of casting for me because Martha Kent is the woman whose values helped shape the man we know as Superman," Snyder said in the release. "We are thrilled to have Diane in the role because she can convey the wisdom and the wonder of a woman whose son has powers beyond her imagination."
 Laurence Fishburne as Perry White:  Editor-in-chief of the Daily Planet and the boss of Lois Lane. Fishburne is the first African-American to play Perry White in a live-action film. Fishburne remarked of his role: "[M]y inspiration really is the late Ed Bradley, who was a CBS correspondent on 60 Minutes for many years ... [The] legendary Ed Bradley ... was a friend, a mentor, and a role model for me, particularly because he worked in journalism, and he was the kind of guy who walked with kings, but he had the common touch. And so he was my inspiration for Perry."
 Antje Traue as Faora-Ul:  General Zod's sub-commander and a commander of the Kryptonian military, who is completely devoted and loyal to Zod. Gal Gadot was offered the role but declined because she was pregnant at that time; this allowed her to be later cast as Wonder Woman in the film's sequel. Alice Eve, Diane Kruger and Rosamund Pike were also considered for the role. About the role of Faora, Traue said in an interview: "What I liked about her was that as a woman, we have certain doubts and we think too much sometimes about ourselves and all these things, they're not there for Faora. She's a bred warrior. So to really focus on that aspect, that fear is a chemical reaction and that it was bred out of her and she doesn't have it, it's liberating when you actually think about it. That you're just a one-track mind, there's no filter, there's no double meaning. She gets orders and she answers those orders without a question."
 Ayelet Zurer as Lara Lor-Van:  Kal-El's biological mother and loyal wife to Jor-El. Julia Ormond had previously been announced as cast, but dropped out. Connie Nielsen was in negotiations for the role before Zurer was cast. Nielsen was subsequently cast as Queen Hippolyta in Wonder Woman.
 Christopher Meloni as Col. Nathan Hardy:  A United States Air Force officer, call sign "Guardian", assigned to the United States Northern Command.
 Russell Crowe as Jor-El:  A Kryptonian scientist who is Kal-El's biological father. Sean Penn and Clive Owen were also considered for the role. Crowe incorporates how his own fatherhood informed his reading of the script to portray Jor-El, stating that "... it was one of those things where that's how it was connecting me. That's the question that Jor-El faces, that's the situation that he's in." Crowe also comments on his preparation for the film stating that: "When I signed on ... well, one, I didn't realize that I would be wearing Spandex—'cause you know that's Superman's costume—I didn't realize that I'd have to fit into it as well," Crowe said. "But, I also didn't realize the type of organiser that Zack Snyder is, 'cause this was really old-school prep. This is sort of David Lean-level preparation, and I really appreciated him. And I was on the movie for three and a half or four months before I even got in front of the camera."

Additionally, Harry Lennix plays Lieutenant General Calvin Swanwick, a United States Army general officer and the deputy commander of United States Northern Command. Christina Wren plays Capt. Carrie Ferris, a United States Air Force officer and the assistant to General Swanwick. Richard Schiff plays Dr. Emil Hamilton, a scientist who works with the United States Armed Forces for DARPA. Carla Gugino portrays the voice of Kelor, the Kryptonian AI service-robot. Mackenzie Gray plays Jax-Ur, a Kryptonian scientist who is one of General Zod's followers. Michael Kelly plays Steve Lombard, an employee of the Daily Planet, and Rebecca Buller plays Jenny Jurwich, an intern of the Daily Planet. Jadin Gould, Rowen Kahn, and Jack Foley, respectively, play Lana Lang, Kenny Braverman, and Pete Ross, classmates of Clark Kent in high school. Joseph Cranford portrays Ross as an adult. Richard Cetrone, Samantha Jo, Revard Dufresne and Apollonia Vanova, respectively, play Tor-An, Car-Vex, Dev-Em II and Nadira, Kryptonian soldiers that follow General Zod.

Production

Development

In June 2008, Warner Bros. took pitches from comic book writers, screenwriters and directors on how to successfully reboot the Superman film series. Comic book writers Grant Morrison, Mark Waid, Geoff Johns and Brad Meltzer were among those who pitched their ideas for a reboot: "I told them, it's not that bad. Just treat Superman Returns as the Ang Lee Hulk", Morrison said. Waid said: "The Incredible Hulk has proven the audience will forgive you and let you redo the franchise". Morrison's idea was similar to their work on All-Star Superman, while Waid's was akin to Superman: Birthright. Mark Millar, teaming with director Matthew Vaughn, also planned an epic eight-hour Superman trilogy, each installment released a year apart, similar to The Lord of the Rings. Millar compared it to The Godfather trilogy, in which it would chronicle the entire life of Superman, from the early days of Krypton, where little Kal-El witnesses his father's tireless struggle to save the planet, to the finale where Superman loses his powers as the Sun starts to go supernova. According to Millar, Vaughn suggested his Stardust actor Charlie Cox as a Golden-Age inspired Superman "when he was a bit more of a regular person".

In August 2008, Warner Bros. suggested a reboot of the film series. Studio executive Jeff Robinov planned to have the film released either by 2010 or 2011, explaining that "Superman Returns didn't quite work as a film in the way that we wanted it to. It didn't position the character the way he needed to be positioned. Had Superman worked in 2006, we would have had a movie for Christmas of this year or 2009. Now the plan is just to reintroduce Superman without regard to a Batman and Superman movie at all." Paul Levitz stated in an interview that Batman holds the key to the Superman reboot. He elaborated: "Everyone is waiting for Nolan to sign on for another Batman, once that happens, the release date for Superman and all other future projects will follow." In February 2009, McG, who previously planned to direct Superman: Flyby, expressed interest in returning to the Superman franchise. August 2009 saw a court ruling in which Jerry Siegel's family recaptured 50% of the rights to Superman's origins and Siegel's share of the copyright in Action Comics #1. In addition, a judge ruled that Warner Bros. did not owe the families additional royalties from previous films. However, if they did not begin production on a Superman film by 2011, then the Siegel estate would have been able to sue for lost revenue on an unproduced film.

The plot of Man of Steel employs a nonlinear narrative, and tells parts of the story in flashbacks. During story discussions for The Dark Knight Rises in 2008, David S. Goyer told Christopher Nolan his idea regarding how to present Superman in a modern context. Impressed with Goyer's concept, Nolan pitched the idea to the studio, who hired Nolan to produce and Goyer to write based on the financial and critical success of The Dark Knight. Nolan admired Bryan Singer's work on Superman Returns for its connection to Richard Donner's version, stating that "a lot of people have approached Superman in a lot of different ways. I only know the way that has worked for us that's what I know how to do", emphasizing the idea that Batman exists in a world where he is the only superhero and a similar approach to the Man of Steel would assure the integrity needed for the film. Nolan, however, clarified that the new film would not have any relationship with the previous film series, in which he commented: "Each serves to the internal logic of the story. They have nothing to do with each other".

Robinov spoke to Entertainment Weekly, and allowed a peek over the wall of secrecy surrounding their DC Comics plans: "It's setting the tone for what the movies are going to be like going forward. In that, it's definitely a first step." Plans included for the film to contain references to the existence of other superheroes, alluding to the possibility of a further DC Universe, and setting the tone for a shared fictional universe of DC Comics characters on film. Guillermo del Toro, with whom Goyer worked on Blade II, turned down the director's position on the reboot because of his commitment on a film adaptation of At the Mountains of Madness, while Robert Zemeckis was also approached. Ben Affleck (who would eventually be cast as Bruce Wayne/Batman in the film's sequel), Darren Aronofsky, Duncan Jones, Jonathan Liebesman, Matt Reeves (who would later direct a Batman reboot), and Tony Scott were considered as potential directors,  before Zack Snyder was hired in October 2010. Casting began the following November. Snyder and Nolan briefly considered setting Man of Steel in the same universe as Nolan's The Dark Knight trilogy, but ultimately they decided to keep that trilogy separate from larger plans at DC. Snyder confirmed both Booster Gold and Batman references in the film, indicating their presence in the DC shared film universe. When Zod destroys a satellite, the words "Wayne Enterprises" are scrolled on the satellite. 

The film's storyboard was created by storyboard artist Jay Oliva, in his first live-action feature film project, along with Snyder. Oliva has cited the Japanese anime shows Dragon Ball Z and Birdy the Mighty as an inspiration for the film's epic battle scenes. During the film's brainstorming, Oliva pitched the idea as "I could come up with something I've never seen in live-action American cinema and only in anime".

Filming
Principal photography began on August 1, 2011, at an industrial park near DuPage Airport under the codename "Autumn Frost". Zack Snyder expressed reluctance to shooting the film in 3-D, due to the technical limitations of the format, and instead chose to shoot the film two-dimensionally and convert the film into 3-D in post production, for a 2-D, 3-D, and IMAX 3-D release. Snyder also chose to shoot the film on film instead of digitally, because he felt it would make the film "a big movie experience". Cinematographer Amir Mokri shot the film with Panavision Panaflex Millennium XL2 cameras and C-Series anamorphic lenses. Filming was expected to last for two to three months. Production took place in Plano, Illinois on August 22 to 29. According to an interview with Michael Shannon, filming would continue until February 2012.

Man of Steel filmed in the Chicago area, California, and Burnaby's Mammoth Studios in Vancouver, which was utilized as a set for Krypton and the extraterrestrial aircraft portrayed in the film. Vancouver's North Shore waterfront area was also used for the oil rig rescue scene where Superman is first introduced. Ucluelet and Nanaimo, British Columbia, feature prominently in the film's first hour—the trademark winter mist and rough seas are passed off as Alaska in the film. Filming took place in the Chicago Loop from September 7 to 17. The Chicago shoot was a unit project, meaning that filming would partake numerous establishing shots as well as cutaways and might not necessarily include principal cast members.

Design
Man of Steel features a redesigned Superman costume by James Acheson and Michael Wilkinson. The costume preserves the color scheme and "S" logo, but adopts darker tones, and notably does not feature the red trunks usually worn by Superman. Zack Snyder said the costume is "a modern aesthetic". He and the producers attempted to devise a suit featuring the red trunks, but could not design one that fit into the tone of the film, leading to their removal from the suit. Because of Wilkinson's unavailability, Snyder chose Acheson to design the suit; however, he only started developing it, and Wilkinson finished the development when he returned, and designed the other character's costumes as well. Due to the substantial weight a practical suit would yield, the Kryptonian armor for General Zod was constructed through CGI to allow Shannon "freedom of movement". In a March 2014 interview with Esquire, Wilkinson explained the reason for the look of Superman's redesigned suit:

Effects
John "DJ" Desjardin served as the visual supervisor for Man of Steel, with Weta Digital, MPC and Double Negative providing the visual effects for the film. Zack Snyder wanted the film to "appear very natural because there's some very fantastical things in there and he wanted people to suspend their disbelief, and we the visual effects team had to make it as easy as possible for them to do so." Desjardin noted that the intent in shooting the film was to utilize handheld devices to make the film feel like a "documentary-style" film. Desjardin said: "We had to think about what that would mean, since we also had to photograph some crazy action. So for a lot of the previs we did, we'd start to think where our cameras were and where our cameraman was. A lot of the rules are the Battlestar Galactica rules for the space cams that Gary Hurtzel developed for that miniseries, where we want to make sure if we're translating the camera at all it makes sense. Unless the action is so over the top, like in the end where Superman is beating up Zod—we had to break it a bit."

For the first act of the film taking place on the planet Krypton, Weta Digital placed alien-like planet environments, creatures and the principal means of display—a technology the filmmakers called "liquid geometry". Weta Digital visual effects supervisor Dan Lemmon explained that "it's a bunch of silver beads that are suspended through a magnetic field, and the machine is able to control that magnetic field so that the collection of beads behave almost like three-dimensional pixels, and they can create a surface that floats in the air and describes whatever the thing is you're supposed to be seeing." The beads of the display, which up close would appear to be pyramids with a slight bevel, were designed to create a surface of the object to depict inside a "console-like" figure.

In the modeling and animation aspect of the liquid geometry, Goodwin explained: "We had to develop a pipeline to bring in assets, so instead of going through the route of reducing the polygon count to something usable what we would then do—you would take the model in whatever way it was made and just scatter discrete points onto it, and extract the matrix onto the animation and copy these points onto the matrix and have these sparse points behaving in a way that the model would." After the animation, artists duplicated the beads onto the animated geometry for a pre-simulated lighting version to get approval on how the object would read. Sims were then run "on all the targets which would be discrete beads floating around on top of the surface which would have its own set of parameters", in which Goodwin further explained: "The bead size or the turbulence that would crawl along the surface constantly updating the orientation was based on the normal provided by the surface. That was then saved to disk and we would use that sim as the final target for the simulation." After the simulation process, Weta Digital ran every bead through a temporal filter to remove jitter to control the noise. Lighting solutions directly worked on the set. Weta utilized RenderMan to take advantage of improved ray tracing and instancing objects.

The sequences where Superman utilizes close-combat fight scenes with the other Kryptonians proved to be a major challenge for the filmmakers and the visual effects crew. Desjardin explained: "When we do these fights and these hyper-real things, we don't want to do the traditional, 'OK I'm a cameraman, I'm shooting a clean plate, I'm going to pan over here to follow the action that's not really there yet but we'll put the action in later. Because that's us animating the characters to the camera. So we would do that animation with the characters—grappling, punching or flying away—and we would take the real guys up until the point until they were supposed to do that and we'd cut. Then we'd put an environment camera there and take the environment. And then a camera for reference of the actors and get each moment. So then we had a set of high-res stills for the environment and the characters. Then, in post, we take the digi-doubles and animate them according to the speeds we want them to move in our digital environment."

MPC handled the visual effects for the "Smallville encounter" sequence. Before providing the visual effects, the shots were previsualized for the fight choreography. After the previsualizations, live action portions of the scene would be filmed in small pieces: "If say Superman was being punched and would land 50 meters away, we would shoot our start position and end position, and then bridge that gap with the CG takeovers", says Guillaume Rocheron, the MPC visual effects supervisor. A camera rig would then obtain key frames of the choreographed actor; Desjardin said "it's a six-still camera rig that's built on a pipe rig so that you can run it in at the end of a setup and get stills of key frames of a performance or an expression, and then we could use those hi-res stills to project onto the CG double and get really accurate transition lighting and color—right from the set."

On set, a camera rig was used to capture the environment of the sequence. Dubbed "enviro-cam", the visual effects crew would mount a Canon EOS 5D and a motorized nodal head, allowing the crew to capture the environment at a 360-degree angle with 55K resolution for every shot, the process would take approximately two to four minutes. The set capture resulted in lighting and textures that could be reprojected onto geometry. Full-screen digital doubles were a major component for the fighting sequences. Digital armor was also added, along with the energy-based Kryptonian helmets. Cyberscan and FACS were conducted with the actors, and polarized and non-polarized reference photos were taken. Superman's cape and costume were scanned in high detail—the cape in particular became a direct extension of Superman's actions.

For the sequences involving the terraforming of the city Metropolis, Double Negative handled the visual effects for the sequence. In order to construct a Metropolis that seemed convincing and realistic, Double Negative utilized Esri's CityEngine to help procedurally deliver the city. According to Ged Wright, a Double Negative visual effects supervisor, it was a much more sci-fi based role, "so we took what they had done and extended it a great deal. The work we were doing was based around the Downtowns for New York, L.A. and Chicago and that gave us the building volumes for heights. We'd skin those volumes with kit parts, but most of it then had to fall down! So we had to rig it for destruction and use it for other aspects of the work as well."

For the destruction of the buildings, the studio rewrote its own asset system to focus towards its dynamic events. The Bullet physics software was a heavily impacted component for the utilization of the destruction. Wright said that "we wanted to be able to run an RBD event and trigger all these secondary events, whether it was glass or dust simulations—all of those things needed to be chained up and handled in a procedural way. One of the advantages of this was that, because it was all based around a limited number of input components, you can make sure they're modeled in a way they're usable in effects—you can model something but they'll be another stage to rig it for destruction." Fire, smoke, and water stimulation tools were developed at the Double Negative studio. The studio transitioned between the existing proprietary volume rendering software to rendering in Mantra for elements such as fireball sims. Double Negative also used the in-house fluids tool "Squirt" to handle larger-scale sims and interaction for more tightly coupled volumes and particles. Regarding the battle between Superman and Zod, Double Negative implemented real photography onto its digital doubles.

Music

Hans Zimmer initially denied popular rumors that he would be composing the film's score, but in June 2012, it was confirmed that Zimmer would, in fact, be doing so after all. To completely distinguish Man of Steel from the previous films, the iconic "Superman March" by John Williams was not used. Hans Zimmer's soundtrack for Man of Steel was released publicly on June 11, 2013. An unofficial rip of the musical score from the third trailer, entitled "An Ideal of Hope", confirmed to be a cut-down version of the track "What Are You Going to Do When You Are Not Saving the World?", was released on April 19. In late April, the official track listing of the two-CD deluxe edition was revealed.

Themes
Many reviewers interpreted Man of Steel as a religious allegory, especially since Warner Bros. set up a website that contains "a nine-page pamphlet entitled Jesus: The Original Superhero". Justin Craig compares Kal-El's struggle to the Passion of Christ, stating that "Kal-El is more than willing to sacrifice himself to save the people of Earth. Originally reluctant to reveal his identity and powers to the world, Superman decides to turn himself over to Zod to save humanity from annihilation." Craig also states that there is an allegory to the Trinity within Man of Steel: "Jor-El returns to Kal-El on Earth as a ghost, guiding his budding superhero son on his journey to salvation. Before Jor-El sends his son off to Earth baby Moses-style, he tells his wife that, like Jesus, 'He'll be a god to them.'" Paul Asay of The Washington Post writes that "Superman floats in space with his arms splayed out as if nailed to an invisible cross," a fact that Craig also mentioned in his assessment of the film. The protagonist of the film is also 33 years old and seeks "counsel at a church."

Writing for The Huffington Post, Colin Liotta compared Zod to Adolf Hitler, citing: "He feels his vision for a pure Krypton (i.e. a society like the one Hitler envisioned with his eugenics program) is the only answer for survival."
The sequence where a young Clark's powers overwhelm him in grade school, leading to him shutting himself in a closet, has led many to speculate that DC Extended Universe Superman is either autistic or meant to represent the struggles of autism. Many noted that when Martha comforts him, she encourages him to hone out the world by focusing on her voice, an example of hyperfocus; a necessary tool for many autistics to reduce overstimulation.

Marketing

Warner Bros. and DC Comics won the rights to the domain name manofsteel.com, in use by a member of the public, for use for the film's official website. On November 20, 2012, for the release of The Dark Knight Rises DVD and Blu-ray, Warner Bros. launched a countdown on the film's website where fans could share the countdown on websites like Facebook or Twitter to unlock an "exclusive reward". On December 3, 2012, the "exclusive reward" was revealed to be an official Man of Steel teaser poster. The poster, which depicts Superman being arrested, generated a positive response and much speculation about the film's story. On December 10, 2012, a website appeared at dsrwproject.com that provided audio signals to be decoded by viewers. It was discovered to be related to the film due to the copyright on the website. By December 11, 2012, the decoded message led readers to another website with a countdown that led to the public release of the trailer. In anticipation of the film, Mattel unveiled a toy line which includes Movie Masters action figures. In addition, Lego released three Man of Steel sets, inspired by scenes from the film; Rubie's Costume Co. also released a new line of Man of Steel-inspired costumes and accessories for both kids and adults. The film has reportedly earned over $160 million from promotional tie-ins.

Viral marketing campaigns for the film began when the official website was replaced by "deep space radio waves". The message was decoded to reveal a voice that said "You Are Not Alone". The official site continued to be updated with new static files that slowly revealed the symbol for the film's villain, General Zod. Shortly after, the website was replaced with a "message" from Zod, who requested that Earth must return Kal-El to his custody and told Kal-El to surrender within 24 hours or the world would suffer the consequences. A viral site called "IWillFindHim.com" was released that showed a countdown to the third trailer for the film.

Warner Bros. enlisted Christian-based marketing firm Grace Hill Media to help spread the Christian themes of the film to the religious demographics. Special trailers were created outlining the religious tones, due to Hollywood studios frequently marketing movies to specific religious and cultural groups. Warner Bros. previously marketed films such as The Blind Side, The Notebook, The Book of Eli and the Harry Potter series to faith-based groups. Warner Bros. also asked Professor Craig Detweiler of Pepperdine University to "create a Superman-centric sermon outline for pastors titled Jesus: The Original Superhero." Regarding this, Paul Asay of The Washington Post wrote that "the religious themes keep coming: Free will. Sacrifice. God-given purpose. Man of Steel isn't just a movie. It's a Bible study in a cape. The messages are so strong that its marketers been explicitly pushing the film to Christian audiences."

Release

Theatrical
Man of Steel held a red carpet premiere at the Lincoln Center's Alice Tully Hall in New York City on June 10, 2013, which featured the attendance of the principal cast members. The film received a wide release on June 14, 2013, in conventional, 3D, and IMAX theaters.

Home media
Man of Steel was released as a single-disc DVD (feature film only), on two-disc DVD with bonus features, and respective Blu-ray and Blu-ray 3D combo packs on November 12, 2013, and in the United Kingdom on December 2, 2013. As of January 2019, Man of Steel has sold more than 2.3 million DVDs along with an estimated of 3.3 million Blu-ray Discs totaling $44.4 million and $76.2 million, respectively, for a total of $120.7 million in sales. The film was later released in 4K Ultra HD Blu-ray format on July 19, 2016.

Reception

Box office
Man of Steel grossed $291 million in the United States and Canada, and $377 million in other territories, for a worldwide total of $668 million, making it the highest-grossing solo Superman film of all time and the second-highest when adjusting for inflation. It is also the second-highest-grossing reboot of all time behind The Amazing Spider-Man. Deadline Hollywood calculated the net profit of the film to be $42.7million, when factoring together all expenses and revenues, making it the ninth most profitable release of 2013. The film earned $116.6 million on its opening weekend, including $17.5 million from IMAX theaters. Man of Steel earned an additional $120 million from DVD and Blu-ray sales.

Man of Steel made $12 million from a Thursday night Walmart screening program, and an additional $9 million from midnight shows. This marked Warner Bros.' third-highest advance night/midnight opening, and the biggest advance night/midnight debut for a non-sequel. The film eventually earned $44 million during its opening Friday (including midnight grosses) and $56.1 million when the Thursday night showings are included. The opening-day gross was the second-highest for a non-sequel, and the 20th-largest overall. Its opening weekend gross of $116.6 million was the third-highest of 2013, behind Iron Man 3 ($174.1 million) and The Hunger Games: Catching Fire ($158.1 million), and the third-highest among non-sequels, behind Marvel's The Avengers ($207.4 million) and The Hunger Games ($152.5 million). It also broke Toy Story 3s record ($110.3 million) for the highest weekend debut in June (the record was again broken two years later by Jurassic Worlds opening gross of $208.8 million). However, on its second weekend, Man of Steels box office fell almost 65%–68% if the Thursday night gross is included—putting it in third place, behind Monsters University and World War Z. Box Office Mojo called it an "abnormally large drop," close to the second-weekend decline for Green Lantern.

Man of Steel earned $73.3 million on its opening weekend from 24 countries, which includes $4.2 million from 79 IMAX theaters, setting a June opening-weekend record for IMAX. The film set an opening-day record in the Philippines with $1.66 million. In the United Kingdom, Ireland and Malta, the film earned $5.6 million on its opening day and £11.2 million ($17.47 million) on its opening weekend. Its biggest opener outside the United States was in China, with $25.9 million in four days (Thursday to Sunday). In total earnings, its three largest countries after North America are China ($63.4 million), the United Kingdom, Ireland and Malta ($46.2 million) and Australia ($22.3 million).

Critical response
The site's consensus reads, "Man of Steels exhilarating action and spectacle can't fully overcome its detours into generic blockbuster territory." On Metacritic, the film received a weighted score of 55 out of 100 based on 47 critics, indicating "mixed or average reviews". Audience polls in North America from CinemaScore for the film tallied an average grade of an "A−" on an A+ to F scale, with those under the age of 18 and older than 50 giving it an "A". Cavill's performance as Superman earned mixed reviews, with some critics commenting on perceived stiffness and a lack of charisma.

Richard Roeper of the Chicago Sun-Times said that Man of Steel covered no new ground with regard to Superman films, and instead, "we're plunged back into a mostly-underwhelming film, with underdeveloped characters and supercharged-fight scenes that drag on and offer nothing new in the way of special-effects creativity". The Boston Globes Ty Burr wrote, "What's missing from this Superman saga is a sense of lightness, of pop joy". The Washington Posts Ann Hornaday stated that with "Hans Zimmer's turgid, over-produced score", the film "is an exceptionally-unpleasant viewing experience". For The Denver Posts Lisa Kennedy, the chief problem with Man of Steel is the "rhythm and balance in the storytelling and directing" which resulted in a film that swings "between destructive overstatement and flat-footed homilies."

Kofi Outlaw, Editor-in-Chief at Screen Rant, gave Man of Steel a 4-out-of-5-star review, stating that "Man of Steel has more than earned its keep, and deserves to be THE iconic Superman movie for a whole new generation". He would go on to name Man of Steel the best superhero movie of 2013. Jim Vejvoda of IGN gave Man of Steel a 9 out of 10 while praising the action sequences and the performances of Kevin Costner, Russell Crowe and Michael Shannon. The performance of Antje Traue as Superman's adversary Faora-Ul, particularly in the Smallville battle scenes, has also been lauded. Peter Travers of Rolling Stone gave it 3 stars out of 4, saying, "Caught in the slipstream between action and angst, Man of Steel is a bumpy ride for sure. But there's no way to stay blind to its wonders." Todd McCarthy of The Hollywood Reporter said rebooting the franchise was unnecessary, but that the film was confident enough and Snyder's attention to detail careful enough that audiences could overlook another reboot. PopMatters journalist J.C. Maçek III, wrote, "The path of this flawed savior isn't quite the one that we have been led to expect and many fans will love that and many fans will decry its comic book-divergent choices. On the other hand, barring Lois Lane's own knowledge of the dual nature of Clark and Superman (thus depriving one of fiction's greatest reveals), the hero we see in the final moments of Man of Steel is nothing if not the character Jerry Siegel and Joe Shuster created ... with just a bit more in the 'imperfections' column." Steve Persall of the Tampa Bay Times stated that, "Man of Steel is more than just Avengers-sized escapism; it's an artistic introduction to a movie superhero we only thought we knew." Time magazine's Richard Corliss said, "The movie finds its true, lofty footing not when it displays Kal-El's extraordinary powers, but when it dramatizes Clark Kent's roiling humanity. The super part of Man of Steel is just okay, but the man part is super." In a review on Roger Ebert's website, Matt Zoller Seitz awarded the film three out of four stars, calling it an "astonishing movie" and praising the conflict between Clark and Zod. But he criticized the film for not having more personal and intimate moments between Clark and Lois. In 2014, Empire ranked Man of Steel the 286th-greatest film ever made on their list of "The 301 Greatest Movies Of All Time" as voted by the magazine's readers.

Speaking to Fox Business Channel, Grae Drake, senior editor of Rotten Tomatoes, expressed dismay over the critical reception, stating, "As much as I love and respect our critics at Rotten Tomatoes, I've got to say I am shocked. Listen, the movie's not perfect but ... I just cannot fathom it. It was a good movie, you guys."

Reaction to the film among comics creators was mixed. Those who enjoyed it include Jeff Parker, Heidi MacDonald, Ethan Van Sciver, Christos Gage and former Superman writer Dan Jurgens. Among its detractors were Joe Keatinge, Sean McKeever, Gabriel Hardman and Mark Waid. MacDonald praised the film's action, drama and leads Henry Cavill and Amy Adams. Van Sciver singled out Cavill in particular for praise. Gage called it the best Superman film since 1980's Superman II. Hardman said that he liked a lot of the mechanics but did not connect with the characters, which robbed the story of tension. Waid, who wrote the origin miniseries Superman: Birthright, criticized the film for its overall "joyless" tone, and for Superman's decision to kill Zod, a criticism echoed by other creators. Writer Grant Morrison, who wrote the critically acclaimed miniseries All-Star Superman, expressed mixed reaction to the film, saying that while they "kinda liked it and kinda didn't", it did not present anything new, as they would have preferred a "second act" type story with Lex Luthor instead of re-establishing the character by presenting information Morrison is already familiar with. Morrison also questioned the need for a superhero to kill, as did artist Neal Adams. Adams suggested that other alternatives were open to Superman when Zod threatened innocent people with his heat vision, such as covering his eyes. He also criticized Superman for not moving the battle away from Metropolis as the character did at the end of Superman II. Jim Lee had a positive opinion: "It’s epic. It’s got a lot of heart, but one of the things that was kind of missing from the last Superman movie I think was the action, and this movie has it in spades. I mean it is a visual thrill ride. It is amazing. You get to see all the powers of Superman, and in all its glory, and I think people are going to be blown away."

Accolades

Future

DC Extended Universe

Warner Bros. began planning a cinematic universe featuring other DC Comics characters following the release of Man of Steel. In June 2013, Goyer was hired to write the film's sequel, along with the script for Justice League. Zack Snyder revealed at San Diego Comic-Con International the following month that Superman and Batman would appear in the sequel to Man of Steel, with Cavill, Adams, Lane and Fishburne set to reprise their roles. The film's title, Batman v Superman: Dawn of Justice, was revealed in May 2014, and it was theatrically released on March 25, 2016.

Cancelled sequel and reboot

Warner Bros. Pictures announced release dates for a full slate of DC Comics-based films in October 2014 for the DCEU. At the same time, the company said that an un-dated Superman film was in development, with Henry Cavill set to reprise his role of Clark Kent / Superman. Zack Snyder said that Brainiac and the Kryptonians imprisoned in the Phantom Zone were considered as antagonists for the sequel at one point, as was Metallo, but ultimately Snyder scrapped both by April 2013 in favor of a plot with Batman as the villain, which became Batman v Superman: Dawn of Justice (2016).  TheWrap reported that a sequel to Man of Steel entered active development in August 2016 and that the studio wanted to get the character right for audiences and was a top priority for them. Cavill's manager Dany Garcia confirmed the following month that the actor was in development on another standalone Superman film. That November, Amy Adams said the studio was working on a screenplay for the sequel. Matthew Vaughn was Warner Bros.' top choice to direct the film, and he had preliminary conversations about the project by March 2017. Vaughn had previously pitched an idea for a new Superman trilogy with comic book writer Mark Millar, prior to the development of Man of Steel, in which the destruction of the planet Krypton would not take place until after Superman had already grown-up on the planet. After the troubled production of the DCEU film Justice League (2017), Warner Bros. re-thought its approach to DC projects. By the end of 2017, a Man of Steel sequel was not coming "anytime soon, if at all". Justice League producer Charles Roven said story ideas for the film had been discussed, but there was no script.

Before the release of Mission: Impossible – Fallout in July 2018, director Christopher McQuarrie and co-star Cavill pitched their take on a new Superman film, but Warner Bros. did not pursue the idea. Later in 2018, the studio asked James Gunn to write and direct a Superman film, but he chose to make The Suicide Squad (2021) instead. In September, negotiations for Cavill to reprise his role for a cameo appearance in Shazam! (2019) ended due to contract issues, as well as a scheduling conflict with Cavill's Fallout commitments. The actor was reported to be parting ways with the studio, with no plans for him to reprise his role in future projects, but, in November 2019, Cavill said that he had not given up on the character and still wanted to do the role justice. At that time, Warner Bros. was unsure which direction to take the character and was talking to "high-profile talent" about the property, including J. J. Abrams—whose company Bad Robot Productions signed an overall deal with Warner Bros.' parent company WarnerMedia—and Michael B. Jordan, who pitched himself as a Black version of the character. By May 2020, Warner Bros. was no longer developing a Man of Steel sequel, but Cavill was in talks to appear in a different future DC film.

In October 2022, Warner Bros. was revealed to be developing a project that was described as being a sequel to Man of Steel with Roven serving as a producer and Cavill expected to reprise his role. The studio was searching for writers by then, and had a wishlist of directors that included McQuarrie. Cavill was revealed to have signed a one-off deal for a cameo appearance in the post-credits scene of the DCEU film Black Adam (2022), though Warner Bros. was interested in having him return for future projects including another solo film, though there was only a verbal agreement on this. Shortly after, Warner Bros. had Cavill announce that he would return as Superman for future projects. Steven Knight had written a script treatment around that time, which reportedly included Brainiac as the antagonist. Warner Bros. executives were not thrilled about it and provided notes on it, and another writer was potentially hired due to Knight's busy schedule soon after. TheWrap reported in November that the project was not moving forward quickly as the then-newly appointed co-chairmen and co-CEOS of DC Studios James Gunn and Peter Safran were developing their DC shared universe plans. Development of the sequel ended in December, and was replaced with a new film written by Gunn focused on a younger Superman. That film was later revealed to be titled Superman: Legacy.

See also
 List of films featuring extraterrestrials

References

Further reading
 Marrapodi, Eric. "Superman: Flying to a church near you". CNN. June 14, 2013.
 Greg Cox (writer): Man of Steel (2013),  (Novelization)

External links

 
 
  
 

2013 films
2010s coming-of-age films
2010s science fiction adventure films
2010s science fiction drama films
2010s superhero films
2013 3D films
2013 action drama films
2013 science fiction action films
2010s English-language films
American action drama films
American coming-of-age films
American science fiction action films
British action drama films
British coming-of-age films
British science fiction action films
Superman films
DC Extended Universe films
Alien invasions in films
Christian allegory
Reboot films
Films set in 1989
Films set in 1993
Films set in 1997
Films set in 2013
Films set in 2014
Films set in Kansas
Films set in Delaware
Films shot in Chicago
Films shot in Vancouver
Films shot in California
Legendary Pictures films
Syncopy Inc. films
Eugenics in fiction
Films directed by Zack Snyder
Films produced by Charles Roven
Films produced by Christopher Nolan
Films produced by Deborah Snyder
Films produced by Emma Thomas
Films about genetic engineering
IMAX films
Films scored by Hans Zimmer
Films with screenplays by David S. Goyer
Films set in the Indian Ocean
Films set on fictional planets
Superhero thriller films
Superhero drama films
The Stone Quarry films
Warner Bros. films
Films about coups d'état
Films about extraterrestrial life
2010s American films
2010s British films